Down and Out in America is a 1986 American Oscar-winning documentary film directed by Academy Award winner Lee Grant.

Summary
It is a biting critique of Reaganomics and exploration of poverty in the United States. It won an Academy Award for Best Documentary Feature, tying with Artie Shaw: Time Is All You've Got.

Production
Produced by Grant's husband Joseph Feury and Milton Justice, this was the first Academy Award for HBO.

Down and Out in America was produced under Grant and husband/producer Joseph Feury's production deal with HBO. The film was greenlit while Grant was still on location in Yugoslavia on another project. She reportedly told Feury that the subject was too important and that if she could not return in time he should let another director make the film. He refused and convinced her to wrap her current project as early as possible and make the documentary.

Reception and legacy
The film received largely positive reviews. The New York Times felt that "DOWN AND OUT IN AMERICA is clear about its message: The system has failed, and the American dream has died.". The film went on to receive the Academy Award for Best Documentary feature, the first Oscar for any cable network.

The film's negative has been preserved in the Academy Film Archive. It is regularly taught in university film and journalism classes. A new print premiered at New York's Film Forum in late 2019 as part of a 13-film retrospective of Grant's work as both actor and director, and the kick off of the film's digital and repertory re-release. Grant and Barbara Kopple introduced the Film Forum screening. It remains one of the most influential portraits of Reaganomics. In April 2020, in response to the COVID-19 crisis, the re-release of Grant's documentaries was re-imagined as one of the first examples of virtual cinema and became "the first virtual repertory series."

References

External links

Down and Out in America on MUBI
Official trailer

1986 films
American documentary films
Best Documentary Feature Academy Award winners
Films directed by Lee Grant
Documentary films about poverty in the United States
1986 documentary films
1980s English-language films
1980s American films